Hungarians is a 1978 Hungarian drama film directed by Zoltán Fábri. It was nominated for the Academy Award for Best Foreign Language Film at the 51st Academy Awards.

Cast
 Gábor Koncz as Fábián András
 Éva Pap as Fábiánné, Ilona
 József Bihari as Utolsó magyar az álomjelenetben
 Sándor Szabó as Német gazda
 Zoltán Gera as Brainer, intézõ
 Tibor Molnár as Gáspár Dániel
 István O. Szabó as Kondor Ábris
 Noémi Apor as Szabóné, Zsófi
 Bertalan Solti as Szabó János
 Anna Muszte as Kisné, Rozika
 András Ambrus as Kis Dani

See also
 List of submissions to the 51st Academy Awards for Best Foreign Language Film
 List of Hungarian submissions for the Academy Award for Best Foreign Language Film

References

External links

1978 films
1978 drama films
Hungarian drama films
1970s Hungarian-language films
Films directed by Zoltán Fábri